SADC may refer to:

Southern African Development Community, successor to the Southern African Development Coordination Conference (SADCC)
South American Defense Council
Singapore Air Defence Command, now the Republic of Singapore Air Force